Thomas Borthwick & Sons (Australasia) Ltd v South Otago Freezing Co Ltd [1978] 1 NZLR 538 is a cited case in New Zealand regarding the remedy of an injunction for a breach of contract.

References

Court of Appeal of New Zealand cases
New Zealand contract case law
1978 in New Zealand law
1978 in case law
Meat processing in New Zealand